Richard Whalley Bridgman (c.1761–1820) was an English attorney and writer on law.

Life
Bridgman was born about 1761, and died at Bath, Somerset 16 November 1820, in his fifty-ninth year. He was an attorney, and acted as one of the clerks of the Grocers' Company.

Works
He left the following works, published between 1798 and 1813:

Thesaurus Juridicus; containing the Decisions of the several Courts of Equity, &c., systematically digested from the Revolution to 1798, 2 vols. 1799–1800.
Reflections on the Study of the Law, 1804.
Dukes' Law of Charitable Uses, &c., 1805.
An Analytical Digested Index of the Reported Cases in the several Courts of Equity, 1805, 2 vols.; 2nd edition, 1813, 3 vols.; 3rd edition, edited by his son, R. O. Bridgman, 1822, 3 vols.
Supplement to the Analytical Digested Index, &c., 1807.
A Short View of Legal Bibliography, to which is added a Plan for classifying a Public or Private Library, 1807.
A Synthesis of the Law of Nisi Prius, 1809, 8vo.
Judgment of the Common Pleas in Benyon against Evelyn, 1811.
An annotated edition of Sir Francis Buller's Introduction to the Law relative to Trials at Nisi Prius, 1817.

References

Attribution

1761 births
1820 deaths
18th-century English people
English legal writers
18th-century English non-fiction writers
18th-century English male writers
18th-century English writers
19th-century English non-fiction writers